RTW may refer to:

Release to web, common method of software distribution on its release stage
Right-to-work law
Round-the-world ticket
Ready-to-wear, clothing
Royal Tunbridge Wells, a town in Kent, UK
Rome: Total War, a 2004 historical strategy video game